The Judgement of Paris Amphora (French: amphore du Jugement de Pâris) is an Attic black-figure amphora named for the scene depicted on it. It is held by the Musée des beaux-arts de Lyon with the inventory number E 581-c and is attributed to the London B76 Painter, who was active at Athens in the second quarter of the sixth century BC.

History 
The amphora was made around 575–550 BC, during the Archaic Period and the tyranny of Peisistratus at Athens.

The amphora is a piece of black-figure pottery, deriving from the region of Attica, which is located in Mainland Greece to the south of Boeotia, with Athens as its capital.

The work is now stored in the Musée des beaux-arts de Lyon under the inventory number E 581-c, in the department of antiquities. It was a donation of Joseph Gillet in 1923. In January 1995 the amphora was cleaned using steam and cotton swabs with water and a little ammonia. It was then buffed with soft fibreglass and the missing half of its foot was reconstructed in plaster. This returned the vase to a good state, though some scratches remain around the neck and the red part of the surface is damaged.

Description 
The amphora has a figural scene on each of its two faces. These scenes are supplemented by floral patterns above the figural scenes and around the lip of the vase, which are identical on both sides. In this period the vegetation decorating painted vases is becoming stylised and symbolic.

The scenes are framed like paintings, but the frame widens as the amphora bulges outwards. The background colour of the scenes reappears at the lip and foot of the amphora.

On face A there are three Greek goddesses: Hera, Athena and Aphrodite dressed in himations, the traditional women's overgarment. Each woman holds a crown in her hand as an offering. The women are led by Hermes in the direction of Paris. The scene, therefore is the Judgement of Paris, which first appeared on Attic vases around 575 bc. The indifference displayed by the three goddesses and the tranquil assurance of Paris' face indicate that this vase was among the first depictions of this subject. Following convention, the individuals are represented in profile. Details are incised or highlighted with colour and tend towards realism, notably on the clothes.

On face B there is a battle between two armoured hoplites, wielding spears, their legs protected by greaves, their heads by Corinthian helmets, their bodies by aspides (round shields, secured to the forearm by a central strap and moved with a handle.)

Context 
The word amphora derives from the Greek amphi- (on both sides) and -phoros (carrier). They are terracotta vases of variable size with two vertical handles, by which they are carried on both sides, designed for the transport and storage of liquids (principally olive oil and wine). They could be painted on their bellies (as in this case).

A large portion of Athenian pottery was produced by the Group of Haimon and the Leafless Group, and was carried thence to ports around the Mediterranean. The rest was produced for local use, specifically mixing, storing and transporting wine and oil.

Attic pottery was valued in the sanctuaries of the Etruscans, where they had additional roles: cultic ritual, banqueting and votive offerings. These vases were bought specially for a given occasion and signified a dedication to a divinity. Generally, Attic cups were common while amphorae were rare.

Production 

The black figure technique is older than the red figure technique and continued alongside it. It was adopted by Athenian potters at the end of the seventh century BC and was still very novel in 580 BC. It remained in vogue until around 470.

To create this form of pottery, the vases were moulded on the potter's wheel, then dried in the open air and painted after a few hours. The outlines of the designs were produced with a diluted black "varnish" made of very fine clay. Initially the figures were painted as opaque silhouettes and allowed to dry. Then the layer of dried slip was scratched with a needle in order to create details (facial features, hair, musculature). At the same time the artists highlighted elements in red or white. Finally the vase was fired in three phases:
 900 °C with the air vents open: the bare clay turns red or brown
 950 °C with the air vents closed: the oven was made smoky by burning green wood and as the carbon oxydised, the vases turned black and the clay slip was vitrified and transformed into "black varnish"
 Lower temperature with the air vents open again: Oxygen circulates, penetrating the surface of the unvarnished parts of the vase which then regain a red or brown colour (depending on the amount of oxygen in the oven). The slip retains the black colour which it developed in the second phase of firing.

Judgment of Paris 

In the archaic period, amphorae display the veneration of gods and heroes in their representation of myths. This vase depicts the myth of the Judgement of Paris.

At the wedding of Peleus and Thetis, all the deities were invited except the goddess of discord, Eris. In revenge she threw a golden apple into the middle of the party, inscribed "a gift for the most beautiful." Hermes picked up the apple and read out the inscription. All of the goddesses who considered themselves the most beautiful became jealous of one another. Zeus was unwilling to settle the debate lest he offend his wife, Hera, by judging in favour of another goddess. By mutual consent, the decision was given to the shepherd Paris.

Paris was a Trojan prince, a younger son of King Priam and his wife Hecuba. However, at his birth, an oracle announced that the future prince would cause the destruction of Troy. In fear, Priam ordered that the boy be killed and had Paris exposed on Mount Ida, where he was rescued by shepherds. Paris had to decide amongst:
 Athena, daughter of Zeus and Metis (an Oceanid), goddess of reason, prudence and wisdom. She promised Paris victory in his future wars.
 Hera, daughter of the Titans Kronos and Rhea, was the sister and wife of Zeus. She was the goddess of marriage, as well as the guardian of fertility, couples and woman in labour. She promised Paris the conquest of Europe and Asia.
 Aphrodite, depending on the version, was the daughter of Zeus and Dione or the product of the fertile foaming of the sea around the castrated genitals of the Sky. She was the goddess of love and sex and offered the shepherd the love of the most beautiful of all mortal women: Helen.

Paris decides in favour of Aphrodite and receives the love of Helen, though she is already wife to Menelaos. His abduction of her brings about the Trojan War, in which he participates. Thus the two faces are related, with face A foreshadowing the dueling hoplites on face B.

In his work Art & Myth in Ancient Greece, Thomas Carpenter compares this work with later representations of the myth. In short, Paris is here represented without his beard and trademark bow, attributes which he is depicted with in a near-contemporary krater made by Chalcidian colonists at Vulci around 540 BC and in most later depictions. Likewise Athena differs from the norm. She usually appears wearing her serpent-hemmed aegis and a helmet, as in an Attic Black figure hydria found at Vulci which was produced around 540 BC.

Note

Bibliography 
CARPENTER Thomas, Art & Myth in Ancient Greece
DAMISCH Hubert, Le jugement de Pâris, p. 64.
DAY Malcolm, 100 personnages clés de la Mythologie, Biographies et arbres généalogiques des dieux, déesses et héros. in the series Le pré aux clercs. 
HOLTZMANN Bernard et Pasquier Alain. Histoire de l'art antique : l'Art grec. Manuels de l'école du Louvre. 
ROUILLARD Pierre et VERBANCK-PIÉRARD Annie Le vase grec et ses destins,  édition :Biering et Brinkmann Deux étapes pour la fabrication : le travail sur le tour et la cuisson
Vases en voyage, de la Grèce à l'Etrurie. Somogy Editions d'art
Guide du département des antiquités, musée des Beaux-Arts de Lyon

Amphorae
6th-century BC works
Antiquities of the Museum of Fine Arts of Lyon
Judgment of Paris